PRTP may refer to:
Puerto Rican Workers' Revolutionary Party, a Puerto Rican political party
Lactocepin, an enzyme